Karin Prinsloo (born 1972) is a South African karateka, gold medal winner of the 6th World Games (2001) in the under 60 kg Kumite category and Karate instructor formerly based in Durban, South Africa, now hailing from Perth, Australia. She is listed among the top 100 Karate competitors of all time.

The World Games are an international multi-sport event first held in 1981 and organised and governed by the International World Games Association (IWGA) under the International Olympic Committee (IOC). The World Games are for sports that are not contested in the Olympic Games. The 6th World Games were held in 2001 in Akita, Japan.

Selection for the World Games involves either being placed within the top 8 sports persons in the world in a sport or winning the continental games. In Prinsloo's case she won the All-Africa Games. Prinsloo was the only South African representative of the sport of Karate to attend the 6th World Games.

In 2009 she was part of the national coaching staff for Team South Africa at the Commonwealth Karate Championships as well as in 2010 at the UFAK Africa Championships and Cape Town.

Achievements 
On 25 October 2008, Prinsloo graded to 6th Dan in the Japan Karate Association (JKA). She was graded by Masahiko Tanaka and Stan Schmidt.

In September 2015 she was graded by the Japan Karate Federation as a Level C Judge, Level D Examiner and Level C Instructor.

Prinsloo represented JKA South Africa at the following international JKA events:
1992: The 4th Shoto Cup, Tokyo, Japan: Ladies Open Kata, last 8 competitors.	
1994: The 5th Shoto Cup, Philadelphia, USA.	
1998: The 7th Shoto Cup, Paris, France: Ladies Individual kata, Bronze Medal	
1999: Female World Cup, Sainte-Maxime, France: Gold medal - ladies kumite under 60 kg
2004: The 9th Shoto Cup, Tokyo, Japan: Silver - Team kumite, Bronze - Team kata	
2006: 10th Funakoshi Gichin Cup World Karate-do Championship, Sydney, Australia: Silver - Team kata, Bronze - Team kumite
2008: Commonwealth Karate Championships, Edinburgh, Scotland: Bronze - individual ladies kumite under 60 kg, Silver - ladies team kumite

Prinsloo represented South Africa at the following WKF World Championships:
1994: Kota Kinabalu, Malaysia
1996: Sun City, South Africa
1998: Munich, Germany
2002: Madrid, Spain

Other achievements:
1995: Harare, Zimbabwe: Silver medal ladies kata
1999: Johannesburg, South Africa: Gold - ladies kumite under 60 kg, Gold - ladies team kata, Bronze - ladies kata
2003: Abuja, Nigeria: Silver - ladies kata, Silver - ladies under 60 kg kumite, Silver - ladies team kumite, Gold - ladies open kumite

In the period 1991 to 2008, within South Africa Prinsloo has been SA JKA female open kata champion 12 times and open kumite champion 7 times and been ranked number one in open kata and kumite under 60 kg more than 10 times. In 2010, she attended the 14th WKF Africa Seniors Karate Championships (UFAK) in Cape Town, South Africa and the 1st JKA Africa Championships in Johannesburg in 2015.

Selected media 
Tekki Shodan – Kata & Bunkai – Shotokan Kata – Karin Prinsloo on YouTube
Heian Godan – Important Points and Bunkai by Karin Prinsloo on YouTube
Children Karate Warm Ups on YouTube

Personal life 
Prinsloo was born in Klerksdorp and grew up in Heidelberg, South Africa. She started training in Karate in 1982. She studied at Rand Afrikaans University (RAU) and obtained a B.Com. (Sport Management) with major in Human Movement Studies. She followed that with a B.Com. Hons (Sport Management) also from RAU. While at RAU she was awarded Sports Woman of the Year in 1992, 1994 and 1995.

In 1997 Prinsloo took ownership of a Karate school called Pinetown JKA Karate and in 2000 established Pinetown JKA Karate Institute. In 2018 Dylan Powell became head instructor at Pinetown JKA. Prinsloo would still like to win a medal at the Karate World Championships.

Prinsloo is active on Facebook with a blog entitled Karin Prinsloo - Karate Blog - For the Love of Karate.

She is married with two children.

In 2019 Prinsloo emigrated to Perth, Australia.

See also 
List of karateka
Karate at the World Games
World Karate Federation
Stan Schmidt

References

External links 
Pinetown JKA Karate Institute
World Karate Federation
Karin Prinsloo on Facebook
Karin Prinsloo on Pinterest
SA JKA Karate on RuClips
 

Living people
1972 births
South African female karateka
Competitors at the 2001 World Games
World Games gold medalists
World Games medalists in karate